Lady Chatterley's Lover is a 1928 novel by D. H. Lawrence.

Lady Chatterley's Lover or Lady Chatterley may also refer to:
Lady Chatterley's Lover (1955 film), French film
Lady Chatterley's Lover (1981 film), British film
Lady Chatterley's Lover (2015 film), British film
Lady Chatterley's Lover (2022 film), British film
Lady Chatterley (TV serial), 1993 BBC TV film
Lady Chatterley (film), 2006 French film based upon John Thomas and Lady Jane